Ashford is an English habitational surname from any of several places called Ashford. Those in Essex, Devon, Derbyshire, and Shropshire are named from Old English æsc ‘ash’ + ford ‘ford’. 

One in Surrey is first recorded in 969 as Ecelesford, probably from a personal name Eccel, a diminutive of ecca ‘edge (of a sword)’ + ford. The one in Kent is from æscet ‘clump of ash trees’ + ford.

Notable people with the surname include:

Agnes Ashford, evangelist
Alan Ashford, cricketer
Annaleigh Ashford, actress
Bailey Ashford, tropical medicine physician
Brad Ashford (1949-2022), American politician
Christopher Ashford, wrestler
Daisy Ashford, writer
Daniel F. Ashford, politician
David Ashford, politician
Emmett Ashford, Major League Baseball umpire
Evelyn Ashford, athlete
Frederick Ashford, athlete
John Ashford, theatre director
Lindsay Ashford, writer
Mary Ashford, murder victim
Matthew Ashford, actor
Nellie Ashford, American visual artist
Nickolas Ashford (1941–2011), American singer, songwriter and producer
Rob Ashford, American stage director and choreographer
Robert Ashford, law professor
Rosalind Ashford (born 1943), American singer with Martha and the Vandellas
Ryan Ashford, English footballer
Shorty Ashford, Us country singer
Thomas Ashford (1859–1913), English recipient of the Victoria Cross
Tucker Ashford, baseball player
Volney Ashford, football coach
William Ashford, painter
William George Ashford (1874–1925), Australian politician

Fictional characters
Alfred, Alexia and Veronica Ashford in the video game Resident Evil, Code: Veronica
Angela Ashford, in the Resident Evil movie series
Milly Ashford, in Sunrise's anime Code Geass

References

External links
 Ancestry.com Map of name distribution in the UK and US

English toponymic surnames